Phaeoceros carolinianus is a cosmopolitan species of hornwort. Often seen near streams or moist situations.

References

Hornworts
Flora of Australia